Üçtəpə (also, Учтепе and Uch-Tapa and Uchtepe and Учтапа and Uchtapa) is a village and municipality in the Jalilabad Rayon of Azerbaijan.  It has a population of 5,748.

References 

Populated places in Jalilabad District (Azerbaijan)